The Carnatic Sultanate was a kingdom in South India between about 1690 and 1855, and was under the legal purview of the Nizam of Hyderabad, until their demise. They initially had their capital at Arcot in the present-day Indian state of Tamil Nadu. Their rule is an important period in the history of the Carnatic and Coromandel Coast regions, in which the Mughal Empire gave way to the rising influence of the Maratha Empire, and later the emergence of the British Raj.

Borders 
The old province known as the Carnatic, in which Madras (Chennai) was situated, extended from the Krishna river to the Kaveri river, and was bounded on the West by Mysore kingdom and Dindigul, (which formed part of the Sultanate of Mysore). The Northern portion was known as the 'Mughal Carnatic', the Southern the 'Maratha Carnatic' with the Maratha fortresses of Gingee and Ranjankudi. Carnatic thus was the name commonly given to the region of Southern India that stretches from the East Godavari of Andhra Pradesh in the North, to the Maratha fort of Ranjangudi in the south (including the Kaveri River delta) and Coromandal Coast in the east to Western Ghats in the west.

History

With the decline of Vijayanagara Empire in 1646, the Hindu viceroys Nayaks, established in Madurai, Tanjore and Kanchi made themselves independent, only in their turn to become tributary to the kings of Golconda and Bijapur, who divided the Carnatic between them. Mughal Emperor Aurangzeb in 1692 appointed Zulfikhar Ali Khan as the first subahdar of the Carnatic with his seat at Arcot as a reward for his victory over the Marathas led by Rajaram. 

With the decline of the Mughal empire, Carnatic subah became an independent sultanate. The Carnatic Sultanate controlled a vast territory south of the Krishna river. The Nawab Saadatullah Khan I (1710–1732) moved his court from Gingee to Arcot. His successor Dost Ali (1732–1740) conquered and annexed Madurai in 1736.
In 1740, the Maratha forces descended on Arcot. They attacked the Nawab, Dost Ali Khan, in the pass of Damalcherry. In the war that followed, Dost Ali, one of his sons Hasan Ali, and a number of prominent persons lost their lives. This initial success at once enhanced Maratha prestige in the south. From Damalcherry the Marathas proceeded to Arcot, which surrendered to them without much resistance. Chanda Sahib and his son were arrested and sent to Nagpur. The Nawabs of the Carnatic were the Rowthers.

Muhammad Ali Khan Wallajah (1749–1795) became the ruler in 1765.

The growing influences of the English and the French and their colonial wars had a huge impact on the Carnatic. Wallajah supported the English against the French and Hyder Ali, placing him heavily in debt. As a result, he had to surrender much of his territory to the East India Company. Paul Benfield, an English business man, made one of his major loans to the Nawab for the purpose of enabling him, who with the aid of the English, had invaded and conquered the Maratha state of Tanjore.

The thirteenth Nawab, Ghulam Muhammad Ghouse Khan (1825–1855), died without issue, and the British annexed the Carnatic Nawabdom, applying the doctrine of lapse. Ghouse Khan's uncle Azim Jah was created the first Prince of Arcot (Amir-e-Arcot) in 1867 by Queen Victoria, and was given a tax free-pension in perpetuity.

List of rulers

Mughal Subedar of the Carnatic

Independent Nawabs of Carnatic

Nawabs of Carnatic under European influence

Nawabs of Carnatic as a British Protectorate 

 Silver shade signifies the French East India Company
 Yellow shade signifies the British East India Company
 * Signed the Carnatic Treaty ceding tax rights

Princes of Arcot

Gallery

See also

 Carnatic Wars
 Amir Mahal
 Nawab of Masulipatam
 Nawab of Banganapalle
 Nawab of Savanur
 History of Tamil Nadu
 Nizams of Hyderabad

References

External links 
 Indian Princely States on www.uq.net.au
 The House of Arcot

Muslim princely states of India
Princely states of India
 
Islam in Tamil Nadu
Former sultanates